CTL can refer to:

 Champions Tennis League, a tennis championship league in India
 Chronic training load, cumulative sports training
 Circuit Total Limitation, US standard for electrical panels
 Coal to liquids, coal liquefaction
 Combat Tank, Light such as the Marmon-Herrington CTLS
 Commission de transport de la Ville de Laval
 Complex Text Layout in typesetting
 Core Transfer Library, a list of college courses for transfer credit among educational institutions in Indiana
 Cut-to-length logging
 Cytotoxic T lymphocyte
 Constructive total loss, in marine insurance

Companies 
 Computer Technology Limited, a British computer manufacturer of the 1970s and 1980s
 Communications Technology Laboratory, a NIST laboratory since 2010
 CTL Corporation, manufacturer of Chromebooks

Computing 
 Certificate Transparency Logs
 Computation tree logic
 Control key, a computer keyboard key
 CTL timecode, a timecode used on video tape

Transportation 
 Centralia, Washington (Amtrak station), USA, Amtrak station code
 Charleville Airport, Queensland, Australia (IATA airport code)